John Scott Studwell  (born August 27, 1954) is a former professional American football player. He was nicknamed "Stud".

College
Studwell graduated from the University of Illinois, where he starred as a linebacker. He left Illinois ranked second behind Dick Butkus in career tackles in 1977, and was drafted in the ninth round by the Minnesota Vikings, for whom he played 14 seasons from 1977 to 1990. 
During that time, he was selected to two Pro Bowls.

Minnesota Vikings
He retired as the Vikings all-time leading tackler with 1,981 in his career and holds team records for single-season tackles with 230 in 1981 and 24 in a game against Detroit in 1985. He was a member of the Vikings 25th and 40th Anniversary season teams and was named one of the 50 greatest Vikings in 2010.

Scouting
After a successful career with the Vikings, he moved into their front office and since 2002 he has been the Director of College Scouting which is responsible for all the preparations of the NFL Draft. Studwell personally scouts the majority of the players the Vikings pursue and spends nearly half of each year on the road.

On April 23, 2019, Studwell announced his retirement from the Vikings organization. He had been in the organization as either a player or as a part of the front office for 42 years.

References

1954 births
Living people
American football linebackers
Illinois Fighting Illini football players
Ed Block Courage Award recipients
National Conference Pro Bowl players
Sportspeople from Evansville, Indiana
Players of American football from Indiana